The Co-Cathedral of St. Alexander also called Cathedral of St. Alexander of Kyiv is a Roman Catholic co-cathedral located in Kyiv, the capital of Ukraine.

The church was built between 1817 and 1842 in a cruciform plan, with a dome at the intersection of the aisles in the style of classicism. The church is located on the former site of a Polish merchant district, near the present day Independence Square.

To commemorate the visit of Russian Tsar Alexander I in Kyiv the Polish owner Antoni Sawicki built, with the consent of the authorities, a wooden church on the site.

The first wooden church burned down in 1823; the new brick church was not completed until 1842. After 1905, the tsarist authorities eased restrictions on churches other than Russian Orthodox. In Soviet times a planetarium occupied the premises. After the fall of communism the building was renovated and became the co-cathedral of the Diocese of Kyiv-Žytomyr (Dioecesis Kioviensis-Zytomeriensis, Єпархія Київ-Житомир).

See also
Roman Catholicism in Ukraine

References

Roman Catholic cathedrals in Ukraine
Roman Catholic churches completed in 1842
Cathedrals in Kyiv
Church buildings with domes
19th-century Roman Catholic church buildings in Ukraine
Architectural monuments of Ukraine of national importance in Kyiv